Colonel Luis Florentino Juan Manuel Silvestre de los Dolores de la Carrera y Verdugo (1791 – April 8, 1818) was a Chilean military officer who fought in the Chilean War of Independence. Together with his brothers José Miguel and Juan José, they were some of most important leaders of Chilean struggle for independence during the period of the Patria Vieja ("Old Republic"). The Carrera family is of Basque origin.

Life
Luis Carrera was born in Santiago, the youngest son of Ignacio de la Carrera y Cuevas and of Francisca de Paula Verdugo Fernández de Valdivieso y Herrera. Carrera completed his first studies at the Convictorio Carolino, the best school in the country at the time. In 1813 – at the beginning of the Chilean War of Independence – he participated in the first encounter between the Patriot and Royalist troops at the Battle of Yerbas Buenas, as a commander of an artillery platoon. That same year he also participated in the disastrous Siege of Chillán, one of the most negative early experiences for the nascent Chilean Army, where after a long siege of the Spanish troops that were barricaded inside the city, the army had to withdraw in the midst of winter that same year. He also fought in the defense of Talca.

After the Spanish reconquista, the Carrera brothers were exiled to Argentina but continued campaigning from exile. On November 21, 1814 he killed Brigadier Juan Mackenna, one of the strongest supporters of General Bernardo O'Higgins, in a duel in the city of Buenos Aires. He was arrested and tried but later freed. Eventually, Luis was taken prisoner and executed in the city of Mendoza together with his brother Juan José by the military of the United Provinces of the Río de la Plata in 1818.

See also 
History of Chile
Carrera family
Juan Mackenna

References

Bibliography 

1791 births
1818 deaths
People from Santiago
Chilean Army officers
Chilean people of Basque descent
Chilean independence activists
Chilean duellists
Carrera family